Wayne Otto OBE (born 18 May 1966 in Hackney, London, United Kingdom) he is a British karateka. He has a  5th Dan black belt in karate and is the winner of nine World Karate Championships and is in the Guinness World Records for winning the most Karate medals. In 2012 Wayne became the head coach of the Norwegian Karate Federation.

Otto was appointed Officer of the Order of the British Empire (OBE) in the 2001 Birthday Honours for services to karate.

References

1966 births
Living people
People from Hackney Central
English male karateka
British male karateka
Karate coaches
Alumni of the University of Kent
Black British sportspeople
Sportspeople from London
Uechi-ryū practitioners
World Games gold medalists
World Games bronze medalists
Competitors at the 1993 World Games
Competitors at the 1997 World Games
World Games medalists in karate
Officers of the Order of the British Empire
20th-century British people